The 1950–51 NBA season was the Pistons' third season in the NBA and tenth season as a franchise.

The Pistons finished with a 32-36 (.471) record, good for third in the West Division.  The team advanced to the playoffs, losing in the division semifinals 2-1 to the Rochester Royals.  The team was led by forward Fred Schaus (15.1 ppg, 7.3 rpg, NBA All-Star) and the double-double of center Larry Foust (13.5 ppg, 10.0 rpg, NBA All-Star).  The team drafted future star George Yardley in the 1950 NBA Draft, but Yardley would sit out three years, opting to play AAU basketball, served in the United States Navy, got married, and then joined Fort Wayne for the 1953-54 Fort Wayne Pistons season.

Draft picks

Roster

|-
! colspan="2" style="background-color: #0000FF;  color: #FFFFFF; text-align: center;" | Fort Wayne Pistons 1950–51 roster
|- style="background-color: #FF0000; color: #FFFFFF;   text-align: center;"
! Players !! Coaches
|- 
| valign="top" |

! Pos. !! # !! Nat. !! Name !! Ht. !! Wt. !! From
|-

Regular season

Season standings

x – clinched playoff spot

Record vs. opponents

Game log

Playoffs

|- align="center" bgcolor="#ffcccc"
| 1
| March 20
| @ Rochester
| L 81–110
| Dick Mehen (19)
| Edgerton Park Arena
| 0–1
|- align="center" bgcolor="#ccffcc"
| 2
| March 22
| Rochester
| W 83–78
| Fred Schaus (21)
| North Side High School Gym
| 1–1
|- align="center" bgcolor="#ffcccc"
| 3
| March 24
| @ Rochester
| L 78–97
| Fred Schaus (12)
| Edgerton Park Arena
| 1–2
|-

References

See also
1950–51 NBA season

Detroit Pistons seasons
Fort